Senator Thatcher may refer to:

Daniel Thatcher (fl. 2010s), Utah State Senate
Kim Thatcher (born 1964), Oregon State Senate

See also
Senator Thacher (disambiguation)